Cinelândia Station is a station on the Rio de Janeiro Metro that services the Praça Marechal Floriano (commonly known as Cinelândia) public square in the Centro neighborhood of Rio de Janeiro, Brazil.

In 1979, the Cinelândia station was opened as one of the first five stations of the then-new metro network.

The metro station is located on the site of the former Monroe Palace, which served as home to the Brazilian Congress from 1914 to 1920, and later as home to the Brazilian Senate from the 1925 to 1960. This palace was demolished in 1976, ostensibly in order to build the metro station.

References

Metrô Rio stations
Railway stations opened in 1979